The little weaver (Ploceus luteolus) is a species of bird in the family Ploceidae.
It is found in western, central and eastern Africa.

References

External links
 Little weaver -  Species text in Weaver Watch.

little weaver
Birds of Sub-Saharan Africa
little weaver
Taxonomy articles created by Polbot